Ice Quake, also called Ice Quake: Nature Unleashed, is a 2010 television action film written by David Ray and directed by Paul Ziller and shown on the Syfy channel.  It stars Brendan Fehr, Holly Dignard, Jodelle Ferland, Ryan Grantham and Rob LaBelle. Set primarily in Alaska, the film follows the members of a family caught amidst a natural disaster. As the permafrost thaws, subterranean rivers of liquid methane and disastrous earthquakes are unleashed, threatening to lead the Earth to a catastrophic end.

Plot 
Ice Quake is an action film about the Alaskan landscape. Under the permafrost, organic materials have been rotting for thousands of years and the compound is very deadly to the planet. As the permafrost thaws, volatile liquid methane and gases are released which causes a succession of destructive earthquakes. A family ends up going to this Alaskan landscape on the hunt for a Christmas tree, hoping to have fun, and unfortunately finds out firsthand how deadly this can be.

As they are exploring these mountains, their dog runs away for an unknown reason and soon after there is an explosion of gas from underneath the ice and the fissure opening up violently that ends up causing an avalanche. The family has to run for their lives. The father takes charge and tries to lead them to safety when suddenly another tremor occurs. This time, it causes the ground to split open, creating a deep ravine that splits the family apart - the parents on one side and two children on the other. They cannot group back together as there is dangerous gas flowing out the ravine when he throw some water in the ravine which freezes it so the father tell them to go to the summit and wait for rescue. The children head up to top to then find out there is a storm on their way causing more concern. The younger brother suggests they keep moving until they can stop at a safe place

As this chaos is going on, the military based around the mountain are investigating the tremors. At first believed the tremors were being caused by earthquakes but then discover that there have been no tectonic movements and nothing has showed on the Richter scale. They then thought it could have been a volcano eruption causing this but also ends up to be false. It is a race against time to stop these harmful liquids and gases before it leads to a catastrophic explosion that threatens the planet.

Production 
Ice Quake is the Syfy Cable television company's own holiday TV movie production. The filming of the movie took place in three different locations.
 Maple Ridge, British Columbia, Canada
 Agassiz, British Columbia, Canada
 Hemlock Valley, British Columbia, Canada
In the production and post-production other companies helped with Syfy's work. Movie Central was one of the main companies that helped with this production of this film. Northwest Digital worked with the production teamto create a quality visual experience, along with The Exile Visual Effects Studio who provided the visual effects to create the perfect atmosphere for a holiday disaster. Pinewood Sounds was in charge of the movie's sound effects and recording.

Cast
 Brendan Fehr as Michael Webster, is a loving husband, father and a scientist studying the effects of the Alaska landscape. He is a geologist who works for the military and is a specialist in his field. He is also the husband of Emily and the father of two children, namely Tia and Shane.
 Holly Dignard as Emily Webster, is the beautiful wife of Michael and the loving mother of Tia and Shane.
 Jodelle Ferland as Tia Webster, is the teenage daughter of Michael and Emily and the sister of Shane.
 Ryan Grantham as Shane Webster, is the young son of Michael and Emily, and the brother of Tia.
 Rob LaBelle as Bruce Worthington
 Nicholas Carrella as "Ram"
 Victor Garber as Colonel Bill Hughes, is Michael's superior in the military, and works with Michael and his family to prevent a methane explosion from wiping out planet Earth.
 Marsha Regis as Carolyn
 Sharon Taylor as Jamie
 Lane Edwards as Reed
 Kurt Max Runte as Wallace
 Aaron Pearl as Cochrane
 Dean Redman as Sergeant Rowland
 James Pizzinato as Boy
 MacKenzie Porter as Girl

Music 
The movie has two songs credited in the soundtrack. As a holiday TV movie both of the songs are traditional Christmas carols: "Joy to the World" and "Here We Come A-wassailing", as performed by the Occidental Glee Club.

Release 
Ice Quake was first shown on the Syfy channel on December 11, 2010 in the U.S. and was released on DVD on July 2, 2012. Since then it has been shown on television and released on DVD in numerous countries including the UK, Germany and Italy. It has also been released on Blu-ray.

References

External links
 

2010 television films
2010 films
CineTel Films films
English-language Canadian films
Syfy original films
Canadian television films
Avalanches in film
Films directed by Paul Ziller
2010s American films
2010s Canadian films